Konstantinovsky (masculine), Konstantinovskaya (feminine), or Konstantinovskoye (neuter) may refer to:
Konstantinovsky District, several districts in Russia
Konstantinovskoye Urban Settlement, an administrative division and a municipal formation which the town of Konstantinovsk and five rural localities in Konstantinovsky District of Rostov Oblast, Russia are incorporated as
Konstantinovsky (inhabited locality) (Konstantinovskaya, Konstantinovskoye), several inhabited localities in Russia
Constantine Palace (Konstantinovsky dvorets), a palace in Strelna, Russia
Konstantinovskoye Municipal Okrug, a municipal okrug of Krasnoselsky District in the federal city of St. Petersburg, Russia
Vyacheslav Leonidovych Konstantinovsky is a Ukrainian businessman, politician, and former member of the Ukrainian parliament.